Villena AV railway station (Villena Alta Velocidad) is a railway station serving the Spanish town of Villena in the Valencian Community. Located  from the town centre, it is served by the Spanish AVE high-speed rail system, on the Madrid–Levante high-speed rail network.

History
The station was built in 2013 at a cost of €11.5 million. It has since been criticised for being one of the least-used stations on the entire AVE network, with 25,859 in 2014. Passengers have increased substantially in the subsequent years, to 92,677 in 2018.

Access
In 2014 the Province of Alicante allocated €300,000 to improve road access to the station via the Autovía A-31. No public transport serves the station, which has been seen as a reason behind its low patronage.

References

Railway stations in the Valencian Community
Railway stations in Spain opened in 2013
Villena
Buildings and structures in the Province of Alicante